The Walkley Award for Outstanding Contribution to Journalism, formerly Walkley Award for Most Outstanding Contribution to Journalism, is one of the prestigious Australian Walkley Awards, and "recognises the achievements of a person or group for outstanding or enduring commitment to the highest standards of journalism and is chosen by the Walkley Directors".

It has been awarded annually since 1994.

Winners

 1994: Robert M. Duffield
 1995: John Stubbs
 1996: Max Fatchen
 1997: Paul Chadwick
 1998: Maurie Ferry, ABC South East Radio, Bega
 1999: Tony Koch
 2000: Paul Murphy
 2001: Estelle Blackburn
 2002: Quentin Dempster, The 7.30 Report, ABC TV
 2003: Julie Duncan, Journalism Educator, South Australia
 2004: Phil Wilkins
 2005: Australian Cartoonist's Association
 2006: Colleen Egan, The Sunday Times
 2007: Gerard Noonan
 2008: Pamela Bone
 2009: Tony Stephens
 2010: Cameron Forbes
 2011: WikiLeaks
 2012: Peter Cave
 2013: Caroline Jones
 2014: Peter Greste
 2015: Trevor Sykes
 2016: Bruce Petty
 2017: Michael Gordon
 2018: Sean Dorney
 2019: Sue Spencer
 2020: Ross Gittins
 2021: George Negus
 2022: Sally Neighbour

References

External links
Walkley Awards website Home Page
Page for search of Walkleys database for winners' names.

Australian journalism awards
 Walkley Award for Most Outstanding Contribution to Journalism